Johannes Regnerus Maria van Angeren (9 May 1894 – 19 March 1959) was a Dutch politician. He was born in Utrecht and died in The Hague.

Biography 
Van Angeren was a jurist and a public servant, who was a minister in London. In 1937, after a short departmental career, he became the first Catholic secretary-general of Justice. Because of his vulnerable position, as secretary-general he advocated tough action against Nazism, he fled in May 1940 with his minister to England and later succeeded Gerbrandy as minister of Justice in London. Later in 1944, he clashed with Queen Wilhelmina when he presented her an Extraordinary Police Order. Such an extreme regulation of the post-war police organisation required parliamentary approval, the Queen said.

After stepping down as minister of justice in Londen, he became secretary-general again in The Netherlands. After the war, he was a board member of the Nationaal Comité Handhaving Rijkseenheid (National Committee for the Maintenance of Unity of the Kingdom) against the independence of Indonesia and member of the Council of State for fourteen years.

1894 births
1959 deaths
Dutch jurists
Dutch people of World War II
Dutch Roman Catholics
Ministers of Justice of the Netherlands
Politicians from Utrecht (city)
Roman Catholic State Party politicians
20th-century Dutch politicians
Utrecht University alumni

Content in this edit is translated from the existing Dutch Wikipedia article at :nl:Jan van Angeren; see its history for attribution.